Damian Willemse (born 7 May 1998) is a South African rugby union player for the South Africa national team and the  in the United Rugby Championship and  in the Currie Cup. His regular position is fly-half, but he can also play as a fullback, winger, or inside centre.

Rugby career

2014–2016: Schoolboy rugby

Willemse was born in Strand. He attended and played rugby for Paul Roos Gymnasium in nearby Stellenbosch. In 2014, he was selected to represent  at the Under-16 Grant Khomo Week held in Pretoria.

In 2015, Willemse was selected in the Western Province squad for South Africa's premier high school rugby tournament, the Under-18 Craven Week. After the tournament, he was included in the South Africa Schools squad for the Under-18 International Series, involving their counterparts from Wales, France and England. He came on as a replacement in their 42–11 victory over Wales, before starting their 12–5 win over France. He was named on the bench for their final match against England, but remained unused as the hosts completed a whitewash in the competition, winning 23–16.

2016 again saw Willemse selected for the Western Province Craven Week side for the tournament in Durban and he again started all three of their matches. He scored two tries in their first match against Boland, and helped the team to a 27–20 victory in the final match against the Golden Lions. He earned a second call-up to the South African Schools team, this time starting all three of their matches in the fly-half position. South Africa beat Wales in their first match and Willemse scored try in their match against the France Under-19s in a 42–3 win. South Africa again completed a clean sweep, beating England 13–12 in their final match.

After Willemse's international involvement, Willemse also appeared for the  team in the 2016 Under-19 Provincial Championship. He appeared as a replacement in three of their final four matches of the regular season, scoring a try on his debut at this level against the s and kicking conversions in matches against the s and the s in the other two, to help Western Province finish top of the log to qualify for the play-offs.

2017: Stormers

Only months after finishing school, Willemse was included in the  squad for the 2017 Super Rugby season.

International career

Damian Willemse made his international debut for South Africa in the 2018 Rugby Championship against Argentina at Kings Park Stadium in a 34-21 victory, coming off of the bench and substituting André Esterhuizen.

Willemse was not initially named in South Africa's squad for the 2019 Rugby World Cup. However he was called up to replace the injured Jesse Kriel in the pool stage. He also scored his first test try against Canada. South Africa went on to win the tournament, defeating England in the final.

Personal life and activism
Willemse has been described as an unusual athlete, with many interests and ambitions beyond rugby. He grew up in Strand, Western Cape a resort and working class town on the outskirts of Cape Town, noted for its white sandy beaches. Strand was negatively affected by apartheid’s spatial planning, which targeted and displaced the areas black, mixed race, Cape Coloured and Cape Malay communities, leading to precarious housing conditions and high unemployment. As a result, like other low income areas of greater Cape Town such as the Cape Flats and parts of Helderberg, Strand is increasingly affected by crime, drug use and gangsterism. In response, Willemse has taken a strong interest in environmentalism and social advocacy, working to lead clean up efforts on Strand Beach and to plant over 500 trees in the local community.

By partnering with the non profit, One Tree Planted and sponsors such as, Vida e Caffe and Adidas, Damian Willemse has worked to make an environmental and social impact in South Africa, while also supporting the global reforestation movement to address climate change through nature-based solutions. Willemse, along with teammate, Siya Kolisi, is also a global ambassador for Adidas’ Run for the Oceans campaign.

Willemse is the younger brother of Ramone Samuels, also a professional rugby union player. Both brothers were members of the  squad that won the 2017 Currie Cup Premier Division.

References

External links
 
 

South African rugby union players
Living people
1998 births
People from Strand, Western Cape
Rugby union fly-halves
Rugby union fullbacks
Stormers players
South Africa international rugby union players
Alumni of Paul Roos Gymnasium
Western Province (rugby union) players
Saracens F.C. players
Rugby union players from the Western Cape